Franz Teyber (bapt. 25 August 1758, Viennadied 21 October 1810, Wien-Josefstadt, today 8. Bezirk) was an Austrian Kapellmeister, organist and composer of orchestral and chamber music. Studying under Georg Christoph Wagenseil, from 1786 he was director of the Schikaneder theatre company and from 1801 a composer and musical director of the Theater an der Wien. His sisters Elisabeth and Therese were opera singers, and his brother Anton worked as a composer to (among others) the Dresden opera and Vienna court.

His niece was Elena Teyber who was born in Vienna and became a professor at Iaşi Conservatory where she was known as a pianist and composer from 1827 to 1863. She married Gheorghe Asachi.

References

External links
 
 

1758 births
1810 deaths
Austrian male composers
Austrian composers
Pupils of Georg Christoph Wagenseil